Toni, la Chef, is a Latin American telenovela produced by Nickelodeon Latin America. On April 29, 2015, ClaroVideo published three episodes before the premiere of the series.

Plot 
This series follows the adventures of Toni Parra, a bold and rebellious teenager who has a passion for cooking, as well as great skill to get into trouble. As soon as she moves to Miami to live with her grandmother, Toni will face a new world, in which nothing seems to be what it is. The "magical" spices and condiments used for cooking have unexpected effects, the neighbouring restaurant has declared war and her grandmother continually tries to "tame her".

Cast 
Ana María Estupiñán as Toni Parra
Patricio Gallardo as Nacho Rosales
Luis Álvarez Lozano as Leandro Miranda
Josette Vidal as Sara Fuccinelli
Alma Matrecito as Diana Ochoa
Ángela Rincón as Olivia González
Jonathan Freudman as Frenchie Fuccinelli
Jorge Eduardo García as Dante
Samuel Sadovnik as Bigotes
Alonzo Arellano as Juan El Futbolista
Frank Fernandez as Pedro Sue Chef
Jeannete Lehr as Dolores
Lucia Gomez Robledo as Teresa
Alejandro Toro as Gaucho

Awards and nominations

References

External links 

American telenovelas
Spanish-language telenovelas
2015 American television series debuts
2015 telenovelas
Teen telenovelas
Spanish-language Nickelodeon original programming
2015 American television series endings
Nickelodeon telenovelas
Television series about teenagers